= Samuel Stead =

Samuel Stead was Archdeacon of Bombay from 1878 until 1886.

Stead was educated at Exeter College, Oxford and ordained in 1861. He served as Chaplain at Karachi, Sholapur, Belgaum and Poona until his appointment as Archdeacon.
